Al-Safsafah is a Syrian village located in the Ziyarah Subdistrict of the al-Suqaylabiyah District in Hama Governorate. According to the Syria Central Bureau of Statistics (CBS), al-Safsafah had a population of 676 in the 2004 census. Its inhabitants are predominantly Alawites.

References 

Alawite communities in Syria
Populated places in al-Suqaylabiyah District